Jollas is a southeastern neighborhood of Helsinki, Finland located in the eastern part of the Laajasalo island. 

Laajasalo